Survivor's Remorse is an American comedy-drama that aired on Starz. It premiered on October 4, 2014, and ended on October 15, 2017. The plot centers around the lives of Cam Calloway (Jessie T. Usher) and his family after he signs a pro-basketball contract and moves his family to Atlanta. The series is produced by NBA player LeBron James. On August 24, 2016, Survivor's Remorse was renewed for a fourth season, which premiered on August 20, 2017. On October 10, 2017, Starz announced that the series would come to an end after its fourth season.

Cast and characters

Main cast
 Jessie T. Usher as Cam Calloway
 RonReaco Lee as Reggie Vaughn, Cam's cousin
 Erica Ash as Mary Charles "M-Chuck" Calloway, Cam's half-sister
 Teyonah Parris as Missy Vaughn, Reggie's wife
 Tichina Arnold as Cassie Calloway, Cam's mother
 Mike Epps as Uncle Julius (Seasons 1–2)

Recurring cast
 Chris Bauer as Jimmy Flaherty, owner of the basketball team
 Robert Wu as Da Chen Bao, Cassie's boyfriend 
 Meagan Tandy as Allison Pierce, Cam's girlfriend
 Ser'Darius Blain as Jupiter Blackmon, Reggie's client
 Catfish Jean as Squeeze, Cam and Reggie's childhood friend
 Sir Brodie as Pookie, Julius's close friend of the family

Guest stars
 John Dennis as himself ("Homebound")
 Gerry Callahan as himself ("Homebound")
 LeBron James as himself ("Guts")
 Tom Werner as himself ("Guts")

Episodes

Season 1 (2014)

Season 2 (2015)

Season 3 (2016)

Season 4 (2017)

Critical Reception and Awards

Village Voice listed Survivor's Remorse as one of the best shows of 2015, saying "If it were on HBO or FX, this glossy but ambitious comedy about an African-American family that moves from Boston’s down-and-out Dorchester neighborhood into the Atlanta sports elite would be the only thing anybody would ever talk about. Instead, Mike O’Malley’s saga of a family whose dynamics get compellingly distorted when one of their own makes it big in the NBA — and the show’s sharp and raunchy discussions of race, class, and sexuality — remains, in its second year, an unfairly buried gem." By the conclusion of its final season, Survivor's Remorse averaged an 82 on Metacritic, indicating "universal acclaim." Daniel Fienberg of The Hollywood Reporter called it “one of TV’s sharpest and most provocative comedies," while Alan Sepinwall praised it as “intensely satisfying and like nothing else on TV.” Writing about the show for Paste, in response to its "Photoshoot" episode focusing on colorism, Shannon M. Houston referred to the show as a "powerful beam, highlighting all that TV has yet to touch on, even during this Golden Age of peak TV."

Survivor's Remorse was a GLAAD nominee for Outstanding Comedy Series in 2017 and 2018. The series and its cast were also nominated for and won several NAACP Image Awards: Tichina Arnold for Outstanding Supporting Actress in a Comedy Series in 2016, 2017, and 2018 (winning in 2017); Mike Epps for Outstanding Supporting Actor in a Comedy Series in 2016 (winner), RonReaco Lee for Outstanding Actor in a Comedy Series in 2016 and 2018 (nominated), Erica Ash for Outstanding Supporting Actress in a Comedy Series in 2017 (nominated), and the series itself nominated for Outstanding Comedy Series 2016–2018. The African-American Film Critics Association awarded Survivor's Remorse "Best Cable/New Media TV Show" in 2015 and named it the 10th best show of 2016.

References

External links
 
 
 

2010s American single-camera sitcoms
2014 American television series debuts
2017 American television series endings
Basketball television series
English-language television shows
Starz original programming
Television shows set in Atlanta
Television series by SpringHill Entertainment